Hoger algemeen voortgezet onderwijs (havo, meaning "higher general continued education" in Dutch) is a stream in the secondary educational system of the Kingdom of the Netherlands and Suriname. It has five grades and is generally attended at ages of 12 to 17. It provides access to the hogeschool-level (polytechnic) of tertiary education.

The first three years are the Basisvorming (literally "basis formation"). All pupils follow the same subjects: languages, mathematics, history, arts and sciences. In the third year, pupils must choose one of four profiles. A profile is a set of different subjects that will make up for the largest part of the pupil's timetable in the fourth and fifth year. It is called the Tweede Fase (literally "second phase"). A profile specialises the pupil in an area, and some studies therefore require a specific profile. Students must also choose one to three additional subjects. Furthermore, Dutch and English, as well as some other subjects, are compulsory. In all profiles except Cultuur en Maatschappij, mathematics is compulsory, but what is done for mathematics is different for each profile. This means that students who do "Economie en Maatschappij" do mathematics Alpha, which focuses more on statistics, and students who do " Natuur en Gezondheid and "Natuur en Techniek" do mathematics Beta, which focuses on algebra. Pupils still have some free space for electives, which is not taken up by compulsory and profile subjects. They can pick two subjects from other profiles. Sometimes, pupils choose more than two subjects, which can result in multiple profiles.

 Cultuur en Maatschappij (literally "culture and society") emphasizes history, arts and foreign languages (French, German and less frequently Spanish, Russian, Arabic, Chinese, Turkish and West Frisian). The mathematics classes focus on statistics and stochastics. It prepares for artistic and cultural training at the hbo.
 Economie en Maatschappij (literally "economy and society") emphasizes social sciences, economy, and history. The mathematics classes focus on statistics and stochastics. It prepares for social science and economy training at the hbo.
 Natuur en Gezondheid (literally "nature and health") emphasizes biology and natural sciences. The mathematics classes focus on algebra and geometry. Since 2007, pupils who choose this profile are free to choose Mathematics-A (Wiskunde A), which focus on statistics. It is necessary to attend medical training at hbo.
 Natuur en Techniek (literally "nature and technology") emphasizes natural sciences. The mathematics classes focus on algebra and geometry. It is necessary to attend technological and natural science training at the hbo.

See also
 Education in the Netherlands
 Voorbereidend middelbaar beroepsonderwijs (vmbo)
 Voorbereidend wetenschappelijk onderwijs (vwo)

External links 
 Ministerie van Onderwijs, Cultuur en Wetenschap 

Dutch words and phrases
Education in the Netherlands